Bhagat Singh Koshyari (born 17 June 1942) is an Indian politician who served as the 22nd governor of Maharashtra from 2019 to 2023.
An RSS veteran, Koshyari served as National Vice-President of BJP and party's 1st State president for Uttarakhand. He also served as 2nd Chief Minister of Uttarakhand (formerly Uttaranchal) from 2001 to 2002 and thereafter, was the leader of the opposition in the Uttarakhand Legislative Assembly from 2002 to 2003. He also served as an MLC in Uttar Pradesh Legislative Council (when Uttarakhand was part of undivided Uttar Pradesh) and MLA in Uttarakhand Legislative Assembly. He later served as an MP in Rajya Sabha from 2008 to 2014 from Uttarakhand and then the MP in the 16th Lok Sabha from Nainital-Udhamsingh Nagar constituency, earning him the distinction of being elected in both houses of State Legislature and both houses of National Parliament respectively.

Personal and professional life
Bhagat Singh Koshyari was born on 17 June 1942 to Gopal Singh Koshyari and Motima Devi at Palanadhura Chetabgarh in Bageshwar district of then United Provinces in British India (present Uttarakhand).

Koshyari holds a master's degree in English and studied at Almora College, Almora (then affiliated with Agra University, now S.S.J. Campus Almora of Kumaon University). During this period, Koshyari was also a general secretary of the students' union of Almora College, Almora, between 1961 and 1962. He has also represented the Executive Council of Kumaon University, from 1979 to 1982, 1982 to 1985 and 1988 to 1991.

He has had a successful career as a teacher and journalist. He had worked as a lecturer at Raja Inter College, Raja Ka Rampur, Etah district, Uttar Pradesh for few years.  Koshyari is a founder and managing editor  of  Parvat Piyush, a weekly published from Pithoragarh, Uttarakhand since 1975.  He has also published two books, Uttaranchal Pradesh Kyun? and Uttaranchal Sangharsh Evam Samadhan.

Political career
He joined the Rashtriya Swayamsevak Sangh (RSS). He took part in the struggle against the Emergency and was imprisoned he was detained in Almora and Fatehgarh Central Jail under the Maintenance of Internal Security Act (MISA), from 3 July 1975 to 23 March 1977.

In May 1997 he became a member of Uttar Pradesh Legislative Council,  upper house of legislature of Uttar Pradesh. In 2000, he was appointed minister of Energy, Irrigation, Law, and Legislative Affairs of the newly created state of Uttaranchal. In 2001 he replaced Nityanand Swami as the chief minister of Uttarakhand. He has also served as the President of the BJP of his state. As a result of his party's defeat in the 2002 Assembly elections, he resigned in March 2002 as the chief minister. However, he was elected from Kapkot assembly constituency, and became the leader of the opposition of the Uttarakhand Legislative Assembly, till 2007.

In the 2007 Assembly elections in Uttarakhand, he was elected again from Kapkot assembly constituency. However, despite the BJP's victory, Koshyari was deprived of the Chief Minister's post by his chief rival, Bhuwan Chandra Khanduri. Media reports have cited that the BJP's central leadership was biased for Bhuwan Chandra Khanduri, despite Koshyari supported by RSS and majority of the elected MLAs. In November 2008 he was elected a member of the Rajya Sabha from Uttarakhand and remained a member till his election to the Lok Sabha in 2014.  He has been appointed a national vice-president of BJP and  also BJP chief in Uttarakhand.

In the 2014 Indian general election, he was elected to the 16th Lok Sabha from Nainital-Udhamsingh Nagar, Lok Sabha constituency.

On 5 September 2019, he was appointed as the Governor of Maharashtra. Further, in August 2020 he was also appointed as the Governor of Goa (additional charge). He stepped down as the Governor of Maharashtra on 12 February 2023, a month after he met Prime Minister Narendra Modi and expressed his desire to resign from his post and retire, after many decades as a successful politician and social activists.

Social activities
He founded various schools in Uttarakhand (Saraswati Shishu Mandir, Pithoragarh, Vivekanand Vidya Mandir Inter College, Pithoragarh; and Saraswati Vihar Higher Secondary School, Nainital).

Even after years in politics, he remains steadfast in his dedication to education. He is currently serving as the Governor of Maharashtra and is the (ex-officio) Chancellor of the University of Mumbai. Since 2019 (during his tenure as the Governor), there have been several crucial developments in the state's higher education atmosphere. These range from the introduction of the NEP 2020, and the setting up of many state cluster universities - Dr. Homi Bhabha State University & HSNC University, Mumbai of which he is the (ex-officio) chancellor.

Controversies 
While Koshyari served as the governor, he sparked a row in a speech by saying, "There will be no money left, and Mumbai will cease to exist as the financial capital of India, if Rajasthani-Marwaris and Gujaratis are removed from these areas of Maharashtra". This statement received large backlash from the opposition parties; even the ruling BJP distanced itself from the situation. Koshyari later apologised for hurting the sentiments of Marathi people. Shiv Sena Chief Uddhav Thackeray lashed out to the Governor for his insensitive and senile remarks terming it an insult to Marathi pride. 

In November 2022, while giving a speech to students of a university, attended by NCP leader Sharad Pawar and Union Minister Nitin Gadkari, Governor Koshyari called Chhatrapati Shivaji Maharaj an olden days idol, sparking a row of discontent over whole Maharashtra.

See also
Koshyari ministry

References 

|-

|-

|-

|-

External links

 Uttarakhand NIC.
General pips state chief, set to be CM

Chief ministers from Bharatiya Janata Party
1942 births
Living people
People from Almora
Chief Ministers of Uttarakhand
Members of the Uttarakhand Legislative Assembly
Uttarakhand MLAs 2002–2007
India MPs 2014–2019
Lok Sabha members from Uttarakhand
Members of the Uttar Pradesh Legislative Council
Rajya Sabha members from Uttarakhand
State cabinet ministers of Uttarakhand
People from Bageshwar district
Indians imprisoned during the Emergency (India)
Leaders of the Opposition in Uttarakhand
Bharatiya Janata Party politicians from Uttarakhand
Uttarakhand politicians
People from Udham Singh Nagar district
Governors of Maharashtra